KRFM is a commercial adult contemporary music radio station in Show Low, Arizona, broadcasting on 98.5 FM. It is owned by Petracom of Holbrook, LLC. Unlike many commercial stations in the area, the station features no satellite-syndicated content, and instead all programming is generated locally.

History
The call letters KRFM were originally assigned to an Easy Listening station in Phoenix, Arizona (now KYOT). When the station changed its call letters in the mid-1980s, an Easy Listening station was launched in Show Low with the KRFM call letters. As of 2013, the station features a morning show called "Tommy Boy in The Morning".

On August 10, 2017, at 2 pm KRFM moved from 96.5 FM to 98.5 FM. The station was licensed to operate at 98.5 FM on August 18, 2017.

Previous logo

References

External links
  KRFM Website
 KRFM – KISSRadioFM Internet Radio Station
 

RFM
Mogollon Rim
White Mountains (Arizona)
Radio stations established in 1984
1984 establishments in Arizona